Cyrtinus sandersoni is a species of beetle in the family Cerambycidae. It was described by Howden in 1959. It is known from Jamaica.

References

Cyrtinini
Beetles described in 1959